The following is a list of state highways in Vermont as designated by the Vermont Agency of Transportation (VTrans). The classification of these state highways fall under three primary categories: Interstate Highways, U.S. Highways, and Vermont routes. Routes in Vermont are abbreviated as "VT #" by VTrans and also abbreviated as "VT Route #" and "Route #" in common usage. A small number of minor state highways, typically bypassing old alignments or short connector routes, are instead assigned names and unsigned four-digit numbers beginning with 9. Most state highways are maintained by VTrans; however, portions of some routes and some entire routes are maintained by local governments, such as towns or cities, instead. These town-maintained routes are internally called "state-designated town highways" and are typically designated as "class 1 town highways". Many of Vermont's state-numbered highways retain their numbers from when they were part of the New England road marking system of the 1920s; for instance, VT 9 was part of Route 9 of the New England system.

Prior to 1995, Vermont used the standard circular highway shield to sign all of its routes, which had black numerals on a white circle over a black background. In 1995, Vermont introduced a new shield for state-maintained highways—a green shield with the word "Vermont" at the top. The circular highway shield continues to be used for locally maintained routes. Some state-maintained routes are still signed with the circular highway shield, but they are being converted to the newer Vermont shield as signs are replaced. Recent guide sign replacement projects along Vermont's Interstate Highways include the newer green shields to indicate Vermont state routes, as the older guide signs used the circular shield.

According to Vermont's 2012 Fact Book the state spent $547 million in 2011. Less than half ($206 million) on preservation and maintenance. 28% of the roads remain in "very poor" condition. The book estimates $100 million would be required to reduce that to 25%. The VTrans report to the legislature in 2012 appeared to disagree, stating that the goal of 25% in poor condition had been met. The Burlington Free Press conducted a survey on 11% of the roads and found that signage was inadequate, often not warning drivers of dangerous curves; striping was inadequate, having been scraped off by winter snowplowing. Therefore, sides of the road could not be seen at night. Speed limit signs were placed near villages but nowhere else; guardrails were unpredictably placed. A spokesperson for VTrans agreed, citing fiscal restraints. Troopers investigating accidents are not required to record road conditions which may have contributed to an accident.

Interstate Highways

U.S. Highways

Mainline routes

Special routes

Vermont routes
All routes in Vermont are designated by the Vermont Agency of Transportation (VTrans). Most are also owned and maintained by VTrans, but some are partially or wholly owned and maintained by the towns it passes through instead. Routes maintained by VTrans are classified by the agency as "state-maintained highways" and signed using Vermont's green route shields. Routes maintained by the town are classified as "town-maintained routes" and signed using the national circular highway shield.

Five routes in the system have both state- and town-maintained sections. Although maintenance along these routes varies by area, VTrans considers state and town-maintained highways that bear the same signed number as one continuous route.

Designations shaded in gray are no longer active.

Numbered state highways

Ferry roads

Named state highways
These roads are maintained by the state but are not assigned signed route numbers. The majority of them are minor connectors between two signed routes, making them similar to New York's reference routes. Unless a town is indicated in the southern or western terminus column, each highway is entirely within the town listed in the northern or eastern Terminus column.

See also

References
http://www.vpr.net/news_detail/90914/

External links
Vermont Gateway - NortheastRoads @ AARoads
Vermont Highway Photos at Alps Roads
Vermont Statutes regarding Town/State maintained highways

 
Routes
Vermont
Highways